Euzophera semifuneralis, the American plum borer, is a moth of the  family Pyralidae. It is found throughout the United States, southern Canada and parts of Mexico.

The wingspan is 17–28 mm. Adults are gray with grayish-brown forewings with broad, wavy bands of black and brown markings across the outer third portion. The hindwings are smoky with black marginal lines fringed with white. The head, thorax, legs and abdomen are dusky gray with bright bronze reflections. Adults in the southern part of the range emerge from April through September. They live for 1–3 weeks.

The larvae feed on a wide range of plants, including plum, peach, cherry, Chinese plum, pear, mountain-ash, persimmon, apple, white mulberry, sycamore, apricot, walnut, pecan, olive, basswood, poplar, sweetgum, yellow-poplar, ginkgo, elm and oak. Plum and other drupe and pome fruit trees are favoured. However, pecan and sweetgum are sometimes heavily attacked all along the Gulf Coast region.

The larvae bore into the bark of their host at scars, wounds, or crevices where bark scales offer concealment and protection. Larval mines are very shallow and irregularly shaped, cave-type burrows between wood and the outer bark. The galleries are usually loosely packed with frass. Larval feeding lasts 30–38 days. Pupation takes place in burrows under the bark in loosely spun silken cocoons partially surrounded by dark excrement pellets. The pupal stage lasts 24–33 days for the overwintering generation but may be completed in as few as 10 days for summer generations. Up to five generations occur annually in central Texas, but only two generations in Virginia, Delaware and Michigan.

References

External links
Bug Wood
Bug Guide

Moths described in 1863
Phycitini
Moths of North America